The 1972 World Championship Tennis Winter Finals was a tennis tournament played on indoor carpet courts. It was the 1st edition of the WCT Winter Finals and was part of the 1972 World Championship Tennis circuit. It was played in the EUR district of Rome in Italy and began on November 26, 1972.

Champions

Men's singles

 Arthur Ashe defeated  Robert Lutz 6–2, 3–6, 6–3, 3–6, 7–6
 It was Ashe's 5th title of the year and the 15th of his professional career.

References

 
World Championship Tennis Winter Finals
World Championship Tennis Winter Finals
World Championship Tennis Winter Finals
World Championship Tennis Winter Finals
WCT Finals